The Kid from Left Field may refer to:

 The Kid from Left Field (1953 film), a baseball comedy film
 The Kid from Left Field (1979 film), an American made-for-television baseball comedy film